Digitothyrea is a genus of fungi within the family Lichinaceae. The genus contains three species.

References

External links
Digitothyrea at Index Fungorum

Lichinomycetes
Lichen genera